The 1927 Michigan Tech Huskies football team represented Michigan Technological University as an independent during the 1928 college football season. The Huskies compiled a 2–1 record.

Schedule

References

Michigan Tech
Michigan Tech Huskies football seasons
Michigan Tech Huskies football